These are the late night schedules for the four United States broadcast networks that offer programming during this time period, from September 2012 to August 2013. All times are Eastern or Pacific. Affiliates will fill non-network schedule with local, syndicated, or paid programming. Affiliates also have the option to preempt or delay network programming at their discretion.

Legend

Schedule

Monday-Friday

NOTE: On January 8, 2013, ABC moved Jimmy Kimmel Live! to 11:35 pm and moved Nightline to 12:35 am.

Saturday

NOTE: On July 27, 2013, Fox launched Animation Domination High-Def.

By network

ABC

Returning series
ABC World News Now
Jimmy Kimmel Live!
Nightline

CBS

Returning series
Late Night with David Letterman
The Late Late Show with Craig Ferguson
Up to the Minute

FOX

Returning series
Encore Programming

New series
Animation Domination High-Def

Not returning from 2011-12:
Q'Viva! The Chosen

NBC

Returning series
Last Call with Carson Daly
Late Night with Jimmy Fallon
Mad Money 
Saturday Night Live
Today With Kathie Lee and Hoda 
The Tonight Show with Jay Leno

References

United States late night network television schedules
Late
Late